"Rumpelstiltskin" is a German fairy tale. It was collected by the Brothers Grimm in the 1812 edition of Children's and Household Tales. The story is about a little imp who spins straw into gold in exchange for a girl's firstborn child.

Plot 
In order to appear superior, a miller brags to the king and people of the kingdom he lives in by claiming his daughter can spin straw into gold. The king calls for the girl, locks her up in a tower room filled with straw and a spinning wheel, and demands she spin the straw into gold by morning or he will have her killed. When she has given up all hope, a little imp-like man appears in the room and spins the straw into gold in return for her necklace. The next morning the king takes the girl to a larger room filled with straw to repeat the feat, the imp once again spins, in return for the girl's ring. On the third day, when the girl has been taken to an even larger room filled with straw and told by the king that he will marry her if she can fill this room with gold or execute her if she cannot, the girl has nothing left with which she can pay the strange creature. He extracts a promise from her that she will give him her firstborn child, and so he spins the straw into gold a final time.

The king keeps his promise to marry the miller's daughter. But when their first child is born, the imp returns to claim his payment. She offers him all the wealth she has to keep the child, but the imp has no interest in her riches. He finally agrees to give up his claim to the child if she can guess his name within three days.

The queen's many guesses fail. But before the final night, she wanders into the woods searching for him and comes across his remote mountain cottage and watches, unseen, as he hops about his fire and sings. He reveals his name in his song's lyrics: "tonight tonight, my plans I make, tomorrow tomorrow, the baby I take. The queen will never win the game, for Rumpelstiltskin is my name."

When the imp comes to the queen on the third day, after first feigning ignorance, she reveals his name, Rumpelstiltskin, and he loses his temper at the loss of their bargain. Versions vary about whether he accuses the devil or witches of having revealed his name to the queen. In the 1812 edition of the Brothers Grimm tales, Rumpelstiltskin then "ran away angrily, and never came back." The ending was revised in an 1857 edition to a more gruesome ending wherein Rumpelstiltskin "in his rage drove his right foot so far into the ground that it sank in up to his waist; then in a passion he seized the left foot with both hands and tore himself in two." Other versions have Rumpelstiltskin driving his right foot so far into the ground that he creates a chasm and falls into it, never to be seen again. In the oral version originally collected by the Brothers Grimm, Rumpelstiltskin flies out of the window on a cooking ladle.
Notes

History 
According to researchers at Durham University and the NOVA University Lisbon, the origins of the story can be traced back to around 4,000 years ago. A possible early literary reference to the tale appears in Dio of Halicarnassus's Roman Antiquities, in the 1st century CE.

Variants 

The same story pattern appears in numerous other cultures: Tom Tit Tot in the United Kingdom (from English Fairy Tales, 1890, by Joseph Jacobs); The Lazy Beauty and her Aunts in Ireland (from The Fireside Stories of Ireland, 1870 by Patrick Kennedy); Whuppity Stoorie in Scotland (from Robert Chambers's Popular Rhymes of Scotland, 1826); Gilitrutt in Iceland; جعيدان (Joaidane "He who talks too much") in Arabic; Хламушка (Khlamushka "Junker") in Russia; Rumplcimprcampr, Rampelník or Martin Zvonek in the Czech Republic; Martinko Klingáč in Slovakia; "Cvilidreta" in Croatia; Ruidoquedito ("Little noise") in South America; Pancimanci in Hungary (from 1862 folktale collection by László Arany); Daiku to Oniroku (大工と鬼六 "The carpenter and the ogre") in Japan and Myrmidon in France.

An earlier literary variant in French was penned by Mme. L'Héritier, titled Ricdin-Ricdon. A version of it exists in the compilation Le Cabinet des Fées, Vol. XII. pp. 125-131.

The Cornish tale of Duffy and the Devil plays out an essentially similar plot featuring a "devil" named Terry-top.

All these tales are classified in the Aarne–Thompson–Uther Index as tale type ATU 500, "The Name of the Supernatural Helper". According to scholarship, it is popular in "Denmark, Finland, Germany and Ireland".

Name 

The name Rumpelstilzchen in German means literally "little rattle stilt", a stilt being a post or pole that provides support for a structure. A rumpelstilt or rumpelstilz was consequently the name of a type of goblin, also called a pophart or poppart, that makes noises by rattling posts and rapping on planks. The meaning is similar to rumpelgeist ("rattle ghost") or poltergeist, a mischievous spirit that clatters and moves household objects. (Other related concepts are mummarts or boggarts and hobs, which are mischievous household spirits that disguise themselves.) The ending -chen is a German diminutive cognate to English -kin.

The name is believed to be derived from Johann Fischart's Geschichtklitterung, or Gargantua of 1577 (a loose adaptation of Rabelais' Gargantua and Pantagruel), which refers to an "amusement" for children, a children's game named "Rumpele stilt oder der Poppart".

Translations 

Translations of the original Grimm fairy tale (KHM 55) into various languages have generally substituted different names for the dwarf whose name is Rumpelstilzchen. For some languages, a name was chosen that comes close in sound to the German name: Rumpelstiltskin or Rumplestiltskin in English, Repelsteeltje in Dutch, Rumpelstichen in Brazilian Portuguese, Rumpelstinski, Rumpelestíjeles, Trasgolisto, Jasil el Trasgu, Barabay, Rompelimbrá, Barrabás, Ruidoquedito, Rompeltisquillo, Tiribilitín, Tremolín, El enano saltarín y el duende saltarín in Spanish, Rumplcimprcampr or Rampelník in Czech. In Japanese, it is called ルンペルシュティルツキン (Runperushutirutsukin). Russian might have the most accomplished imitation of the German name with Румпельшти́льцхен (Rumpelʹshtílʹtskhen).

In other languages, the name was translated in a poetic and approximate way. Thus Rumpelstilzchen is known as Päronskaft (literally "Pear-stalk") in Swedish, where the sense of stilt or stalk of the second part is retained.

Slovak translations use Martinko Klingáč. Polish translations use Titelitury (or Rumpelsztyk) and Finnish ones Tittelintuure, Rompanruoja or Hopskukkeli. The Hungarian name is Tűzmanócska and in Serbo-Croatian Cvilidreta ("Whine-screamer"). The Slovenian translation uses "Špicparkeljc" (pointy-hoof). For Hebrew the poet Avraham Shlonsky composed the name  (Ootz-li Gootz-li, a compact and rhymy touch to the original sentence and meaning of the story, "My adviser my midget"), when using the fairy tale as the basis of a children's musical, now a classic among Hebrew children's plays. Greek translations have used Ρουμπελστίλτσκιν (from the English) or Κουτσοκαλιγέρης (Koutsokaliyéris), which could figure as a Greek surname, formed with the particle κούτσο- (koútso- "limping"), and is perhaps derived from the Hebrew name. In Italian, the creature is usually called Tremotino, which is probably formed from the world tremoto, which means "earthquake" in Tuscan dialect, and the suffix "-ino", which generally indicates a small and/or sly character. The first Italian edition of the fables was published in 1897, and the books in those years were all written in Tuscan. Urdu versions of the tale used the name Tees Mar Khan for the imp.

Rumpelstiltskin principle 
The value and power of using personal names and titles is well established in psychology, management, teaching and trial law. It is often referred to as the "Rumpelstiltskin principle". It derives from a very ancient belief that to give or know the true name of a being is to have power over it, for which compare Adam's naming of the animals in Genesis 2:19-20.

Media and popular culture

Literature adaptations 
 Gilded, a 2021 first novel of a duology by Marissa Meyer about the god of lies

Film 
 Rumpelstiltskin (1915 film), an American silent film, directed by Raymond B. West
 Rumpelstiltskin (1940 film), a German fantasy film, directed by Alf Zengerling
 Rumpelstiltskin (1955 film), a German fantasy film, directed by Herbert B. Fredersdorf
 Rumpelstiltskin (1985 film), a twenty-four-minute animated feature
 Rumpelstiltskin (1987 film), an American-Israeli film
 Rumpelstiltskin (1995 film), an American horror film, loosely based on the Grimm fairy tale
 Rumpelstilzchen (2009 film), a German TV adaptation starring Gottfried John and Julie Engelbrecht

Ensemble media 
 "Rumpelstiltskin", a 1995 episode from Happily Ever After: Fairy Tales for Every Child.

 Rumpelstiltskin appears as a figment of Chief O'Brien's imagination in the 16th episode If Wishes Were Horses of season 1 in the Star Trek series Deep Space Nine.

 Rumpelstiltskin appears as a villainous character in the Shrek franchise, first voiced by Conrad Vernon in a minor role in Shrek the Third. In Shrek Forever After, the character's appearance and persona are significantly altered to become the main villain of the film, now voiced by Walt Dohrn. A diminutive, evil con man who deals in magical contracts, this version of the character has a personal vendetta against the ogre Shrek, as his plot to take over Far Far Away was foiled by Shrek's rescue of Princess Fiona in the first film. Rumpel manipulates Shrek into signing a deal that creates an alternate reality where Fiona was never rescued and Rumpel ascended to power with the help of an army of witches, a giant goose named Fifi, and the Pied Piper. Dohrn's version of the character also appears in various spin-offs.

 In Once Upon a Time, Rumplestiltskin is one of the integral characters, portrayed by Robert Carlyle. In the Enchanted Forest, Rumplestiltskin was a cowardly peasant who ascended to power by killing the "Dark One" and gaining his dark magic to protect his son Baelfire. However, the darkness causes him to grow increasingly twisted and violent. While attempting to eliminate his father's curse, Baelfire is lost to a land without magic. Ultimately aiming to save his son, Rumplestiltskin orchestrates a complex series of events, establishing himself as a dark sorcerer who strikes magical deals with various individuals in the fairy tale world, and manipulating the Evil Queen into cursing the land by transporting everyone to the Land Without Magic, while implementing failsafes to break the Dark Curse and maintain his powers. Throughout the series, he wrestles with the conflict between his dark nature and the call to use his power for good.

 Rumpelstiltskin appears in Ever After High as an infamous professor known for making students spin straw into gold as a form of extra credit and detention. He deliberately gives his students bad grades in such a way they are forced to ask for extra credit.

Theater 
 Utz-li-Gutz-li, a 1965 Israeli stage musical written by Avraham Shlonsky
 Rumpelstiltskin, a 2011 American stage musical

References

Selected bibliography 

 [Analysis of Aarne-Thompson-Uther tale types 500 and 501]

Further reading 

 Dvořák, Karel. (1967). "AaTh 500 in deutschen Varianten aus der Tschechoslowakei". In: Fabula. 9: 100-104. 10.1515/fabl.1967.9.1-3.100.
 Paulme, Denise. "Thème et variations: l'épreuve du «nom inconnu» dans les contes d'Afrique noire". In: Cahiers d'études africaines, vol. 11, n°42, 1971. pp. 189-205. DOI: Thème et variations : l'épreuve du « nom inconnu » dans les contes d'Afrique noire.; www.persee.fr/doc/cea_0008-0055_1971_num_11_42_2800

External links 

 
 Free version of translation of "Household Tales" by Brothers Grimm from Project Gutenberg
 'Tom Tit Tot: an essay on savage philosophy in folk-tale' by Edward Clodd (1898)
 Parallel German-English text in ParallelBook format
 1985 TV movie

 
Grimms' Fairy Tales
Goblins
Fairy tale stock characters
Male characters in fairy tales
Male literary villains
ATU 500-559